The men's discus F57/58 event at the 2008 Summer Paralympics took place at the Beijing National Stadium at 09:00 on 13 September. There was a single round of competition; after the first three throws, only the top eight had 3 further throws.
The competition was won by Alexey Ashapatov, representing .

Results

 
WR = World Record. SB = Seasonal Best.

References

Athletics at the 2008 Summer Paralympics